Soekarno–Hatta International Airport Terminal 3 (also known as Terminal 3 Ultimate) is an international terminal of Soekarno–Hatta International Airport serving Greater Jakarta, Indonesia. It is located on northeast side of the airport. Terminal 3 has a different style than other terminals of the airport. Terminal 1 and 2 were built with incorporation of the local architecture into the design, but Terminal 3 is built in contemporary modern design with environmental friendly and traditional sense. The terminal was first named as Terminal 3 Ultimate but later it was decided to integrate with the old Terminal 3.

The airline group under PT Garuda Indonesia (Persero) Tbk including Garuda Indonesia and Citilink Indonesia has officially operated all of its flights both domestic and international (expect low-cost budget flights) from this terminal. For all international, domestic and commercial service airlines operating at Soekarno-Hatta International Airport serve all international terminal from Terminal 3 (except low-cost budget airlines). The terminal has been named as the best airport terminal in 2017 in Indonesia at the ninth Bandara Awards initiated by Majalah Bandara.

History
The former Terminal 3 was officially opened for commercial flights when Mandala Airlines and Indonesia AirAsia started operations in T3 for their domestic flights on 20 April 2009 followed by international flights on 15 November 2011. Former Terminal 3 had capacity of 4 million passengers per annum, had 30 check-in counters, 6 baggage carousels and 3 gates with two jet bridges. In 2012, Angkasa Pura II, the airport operator of Soekarno-Hatta, undertook a master plan to upgrade Soekarno-Hatta International airport into a world class airport and ultimately build an Aerotropolis. Expansion of Terminal 3 is part of that master-plan. New Terminal 3 was officially opened to the public on 9 August 2016. T3 is being built as an aerotropolis terminal. Terminal 3 will be able to serve 60 airplanes from the current 40 airplanes. Since its opening, the terminal has been plagued with numerous problems, ranging from long baggage wait times, insufficient and unsafe lighting, lack of proper signage, as well as having its parking buildings experience near continuous traffic jams.

New Terminal 3 was officially formal opened to the public by the commercial aviation including flag carrier Garuda Indonesia for new domestic flights on 9 August 2016 at midnight stroke WIB marked by the official opening of the very first landmark building and iconic so number one largest highest longest international airport in all Jakarta metropolitan and surrounding areas and New Terminal 3 was officially formal opened to the public by the commercial aviation including flag carrier Garuda Indonesia for new international flights on 1 May 2017. Formerly the new T3 has no link with the old T3 building but the old T3 is now renovated with connections to built between the new and old terminals. So all international flag carrier fully was officially moved to new Terminal 3 on 1 May 2019 as officially fully completed.

Facilities

The Terminal 3 spans 1.2 kilometers and the apron is able to serve 40 aircraft. The terminal has the capacity to serve 25 million international passengers each year. This is a modern terminal specifically designed to cater as a transit point for international airlines. Spanning 422,804 sq meters, the new terminal is slightly larger than Changi Airport's Terminal 3. It has 10 gates for international flights and 18 for domestic, 206 check-in counters, 38 self check-in and 12 bag drop counters, 59 aerobridges, two four-star hotels, meeting rooms, duty-free shops, retail outlets, restaurants and multi-storey carparks. Total area of the main building of new terminal 3 is about 331,101m2, the parking building 85,578 sq meters and the VVIP passengers building 6,124 sq meters. The check-in area of the terminal is arranged in the form of eight clusters. The terminal has an automated baggage handling system featuring at least 13 conveyor belts. The parking area has capacity to accommodate 2600 cars and 2600 motorcycles.

Terminal 3 is equipped with BHS level 5 to detect explosives and directly move into blankets, an Airport Security System (ASS) which can control up to 600 CCTVs to detect faces who are available in the security register. The terminal has "Intelligence Building Management System" (IBMS) which can control uses of water and electricity, rain water system to produce clean water from rain, a recycled water system to produce toilet water from used toilet water, and illumination technology control to illuminate the terminal depending on the weather surrounding the terminal.

Terminal 3 has WiFi access of speeds up to 50 Mbit/s in certain areas in the airport. It is free to access for an initial 15 minutes and then passengers will be able to pay Rp 5,000 per hour. The terminal has a Tourist Information Center (TIC) from where 
tourists may get information on tourist attractions, transportation, accommodation and other travel related information in Indonesia.

Hotel and Co-working space
There is a premium co-working space named as APSpace in the terminal. The co-working space has serviced offices, meeting rooms, event spaces, business lounges, high speed internet. and sleeping pods which is supported by advanced technologies.

Terminal 3 also has a Digital Airport Hotel or Capsule hotel with 120 rooms, which has Alpha-type and Beta-type rooms.

Two 4 star hotels are now under construction which is expected to be operational by the end of 2019.

Commercial zone
Terminal 3 of SHIA Ultimate provides a commercial zone with a different atmosphere and scenery compared to other airports in Indonesia. The commercial area of Terminal 3 Ultimate covers an area of 71,225 square meters. The area is divided into several zones, each for food & beverages with an area of 23,301 square meters, retail 22,023 square meters, servicing 2,007 square meters, duty free 4,784 square meters, lounge 8,496 square meters, exhibition 1,493 square meters, and office/ airline 19,121 square meters.

At present tenants of commercial area are, BNI, BRI Digital, Bank Mandiri, GraPari, Cold Stone Creamery, Krispy Kreme, KFC, Alfaexpress, Starbucks Coffee, OldTown White Coffee, Burger King, J.CO Donuts, Hoka-Hoka Bento, Coach, Tumi, Mothercare, Batik Keris, Roti'O, Excelso Cafe, Ramen 38 Sanpachi, Liberica Coffee, Steak Hotel by Holycow!, Solaria, Delico, Ardent Coffee, Warung Koffie Batavia, Nanny's Pavilion, Roti Unyil, Verde, Danar Hadi, Re juve, Hyundai Motor Company, Oppo, Vivo, Panasonic and more due to open in the nearby future.

Flight 
Terminal 3 is the airport's newest and largest terminal. This terminal is used as base Garuda Indonesia and Citilink and serves as a full service terminal for all international, all domestic and all commercial flights.

Domestic flight 
Citilink
Garuda Indonesia
TransNusa

International flight 
Air China
All Nippon Airways
Asiana Airlines
Batik Air
Cathay Pacific
Cebu Pacific
China Airlines
China Eastern Airlines
China Southern Airlines
Citilink
Emirates
Etihad Airways
Ethiopian Airlines
Eva Air
Flynas
Garuda Indonesia
Japan Airlines
Jetstar Asia Airways
KLM
Korean Air
Malaysia Airlines
Oman Air
Philippine Airlines
Qatar Airways
Qantas
Royal Brunei Airlines
Saudia
Scoot
Singapore Airlines
SriLankan Airlines
Thai AirAsia
Thai Airways
Thai Lion Air
Thai Smile
Turkish Airlines
Vietnam Airlines
Xiamen Airlines

Terminal 
Terminal 3 is the airport's newest and largest terminal. This terminal is used as base Garuda Indonesia and Citilink and serves as a full service terminal for international and domestic flights.

Terminal 3A 
Cathay Pacific
Garuda Indonesia
KLM
Korean Air
Qantas
Xiamen Airlines

Terminal 3B 
Air China
Asiana Airlines
All Nippon Airways
China Airlines
Eva Air
Emirates
Qatar Airways
Saudia
Thai Airways
Turkish Airlines
Vietnam Airlines

Terminal 3C 
China Eastern Airlines
China Southern Airlines
Etihad Airways
Ethiopian Airlines
Japan Airlines
Malaysia Airlines
Oman Air
Singapore Airlines

Terminal 3D 
Cebu Pacific
Jetstar Asia Airways
Philippine Airlines
Royal Brunei Airlines
Scoot
Thai Lion Air

Terminal 3E 
Citilink
TransNusa

Terminal 3F 
Garuda Indonesia

Airlines and destinations

Passenger

Ground transportation
Free shuttle buses are available, which connects Terminal 1, 2 and 3. Also there is a Skytrain/people mover system that connects Terminal 1, 2 and 3. The headway of the skytrain is 5 minutes, with 7 minutes needed to transfer from Terminal 1 to Terminal 3. Bus services including the state-owned Perum DAMRI and other private companies provide services from the airport to various destinations in Greater Jakarta and other adjacent areas. The buses operate from 06.00 to 23.00.

A railway service, Soekarno-Hatta Airport Rail Link is connected through the skytrain system. The railway service connects the airport to the city center of Jakarta.

See also

Soekarno-Hatta International Airport
List of largest buildings in the world
Garuda Indonesia
SkyTeam
Changi Airport Terminal 3

References

Airport terminals
Airports in Jakarta
Buildings and structures in Banten
Soekarno–Hatta International Airport
2016 establishments in Indonesia